The 1985 World Juniors Track Cycling Championships were the 11th annual Junior World Championships for track cycling held in Stuttgart, West Germany in August 1985.

The Championships had five events for men only: Sprint, Points race, Individual pursuit, Team pursuit and 1 kilometre time trial.

Events

Medal table

References

UCI Juniors Track World Championships
1985 in track cycling
1985 in German sport